Casper Radza (born 26 February 1994) Danish footballer who plays as a goalkeeper for Middelfart G&BK.

Career

Odense Boldklub
March 2012 Radza extended his contract with OB. The first year of the contract was a part-time contract because he should complete his education, after which the young goalkeeper joined as a full-time professional in the summer of 2013.
This means that in the summer of 2013 he was moved up to the senior squad.

He got the role as the third goalkeeper in the senior squad.

Næsby BK
Just three hours after Radza was released by OB, he joined the Danish 2nd Division-club Næsby BK.

References 

1. http://www.ob.dk/artikel/ob-forlaenger-med-casper-radza.aspx
2. http://www.bold.dk/nyt/OB-forlaenger-med-U20-landsholdskeeper

External links
 
 Casper Radza on DBU

1994 births
Living people
Danish men's footballers
Danish Superliga players
Odense Boldklub players
Place of birth missing (living people)
Association football goalkeepers
Middelfart Boldklub players
Næsby Boldklub players